Lesbos in Love is a Chilean musical duo formed in Santiago by Jazmin Avendaño and Tonko Yutronic.

Biography
Lesbos in Love formed in 2000 in Santiago, Chile as a duo whose members came from different bands (Miradas & Doncellas, Ciudadano Kane, Sincro and Area 52 among others). Jazmin Avendaño and Tonko Yutronic had previously met in 1996 under a project called Astradyne (named after the homonymous song by Ultravox) with ex-Artekknia member Mario Aguilar. Together, they recorded just one song, “Nas Noites” which remains unreleased until now.
The Ghost of Her is their debut album, which comprises nine songs composed and produced between 2000 and 2001. It is sung in English and Portuguese.

During 2002, they were invited to contribute to the soundtrack for the film Sangre Eterna by director Jorge Olguin. The selected song was “The End”, included in the homonymous album that Warner Music Chile released in November of the same year. Due to the relative success of the movie, they decided to put out a domestic edition in which “The End” was the main single and “Alem do sol” as its B-side (an attempt to show both musical sides of the band; an accessible pop approach and a more darker contemplative one).

The following years saw the band involved in gigs and the finishing of the album, which was done entirely at Yutronic’s home studio (from recording and producing to mixing and mastering). This gave them enough freedom to develop a musical concept of their own, that shows an elegant mixture of pop and electronics with a dark touch.

Their second album Hypercubus was recorded during 2008 and 2009 and was released online independently in 2013.

Members
 Jazmin Avendaño - vocals
 Tonko Yutronic - keyboards

Discography

Albums
 The Ghost of Her (2006)
 Hypercubus (2013)

Singles
 "The End" (2002)

Others
 Sangre Eterna Original Soundtrack (2002) (CD)

External links
 Official website
 Unofficial website
 Record label
 Audio streaming website
 Audio streaming website

Chilean musical duos
Chilean synthpop groups
Chilean new wave musical groups
Chilean pop music groups